The Institute for New Economic Thinking (INET) is a New York City–based nonprofit think tank.  It was founded in October 2009 as a result of the 2007–2012 global financial crisis, and runs a variety of affiliated programs at major universities such as the Cambridge-INET Institute at the University of Cambridge.

History
INET was founded with an initial pledge of $50 million from businessman and philanthropist George Soros.

Affiliates
The Institute has disbursed approximately $4 million annually in research grants to students and professors. The Cambridge-INET Institute (co-funded with William H. Janeway) established an advanced institute for economic thinking at the University of Cambridge, The Cambridge-INET Institute was endowed with $3.75 million grant from the Keynes Fund for Applied Economics, Isaac Newton Trust, and the University of Cambridge Faculty of Economics. In January 2011, the INET partnered with the  Centre for International Governance Innovation to support research in economic theory and innovative projects. Similar collaborations exist with the INET at the Oxford Martin School, which was co-funded by James Martin, as well as the INET Center on Imperfect Knowledge Economics (IKE) at the University of Copenhagen.

Programs and projects
Research programs supported by INET include:

 INET Grant program to support researchers who challenge economic orthodoxy and help develop new paradigms in the discipline.
Lecture series with economists and thinkers including Michael Sandel, William Janeway, Perry Mehrling, and others
 The Human Capital and Economic Opportunity Global Working Group, headed by James Heckman, is affiliated with the Becker Friedman Institute for Research in Economics at University of Chicago.

Leadership
The executive director is Robert Johnson, former managing director at the hedge funds Soros Fund Management and Moore Capital Management.

See also

 Economic history
 Heterodox economics
 Economic sociology
 Political economy
 History of economic thought
 Post-Keynesian economics

References

External links
 
 YouTube channel - INETeconomics
 Cambridge-INET Institute
 INET at the Oxford Martin School
 INET Center on Imperfect Knowledge Economics

 
Political and economic think tanks in the United States
Think tanks established in 2009
2009 establishments in New York City
George Soros